Wilmer Alexander Aguirre Vásquez (born 5 October 1983) is a Peruvian footballer who currently plays for Alianza Lima.

Career
Aguirre began his career in the youth side for Alianza Lima and joined in January 2002 on loan to Atlas Guadalajara. After eleven months on loan in Mexico returned in December 2002 to his club Alianza Lima. After another three years for Alianza Lima left in summer 2006 Peru to sign for Ligue 2 club FC Metz. He scored only 4 goals in 29 matches in two seasons and returned 2008 on loan to his youthclub Alianza Lima. After a good season for Alianza Lima which scored 18 goals in 40 games, his club Alianza Lima pulled the sold option from him by his club FC Metz. On 25 May 2010 the 27-year-old forward "El Zorrito" left Alianza Lima to sign a three-year deal with San Luis de Potosì.

In January 2018, Aguirre joined Unión Comercio. A year later, he joined Ayacucho FC. He left the club at the end of the year. On 24 February 2020, Aguirre signed with Peruvian Segunda División club Santos FC.

References

External links
 

1983 births
Living people
People from Pisco, Peru
Association football forwards
Peruvian footballers
Peru international footballers
Peruvian expatriate footballers
Club Alianza Lima footballers
FBC Melgar footballers
FC Metz players
San Luis F.C. players
Cimarrones de Sonora players
Juan Aurich footballers
Unión Comercio footballers
Ayacucho FC footballers
Santos de Nasca players
Peruvian Primera División players
Liga MX players
Ascenso MX players
Ligue 2 players
Ligue 1 players
Peruvian expatriate sportspeople in France
Peruvian expatriate sportspeople in Mexico
Expatriate footballers in France
Expatriate footballers in Mexico